The 1998 Australian federal election was held to determine the members of the 39th Parliament of Australia. It was held on 3 October 1998. All 148 seats of the House of Representatives and 40 seats of the 76-seat Senate were up for election. The incumbent centre-right Liberal/National Coalition government led by Prime Minister John Howard of the Liberal Party and coalition partner Tim Fischer of the National Party defeated the centre-left Australian Labor Party opposition led by Opposition Leader Kim Beazley, despite losing the nationwide popular and two-party preferred vote.

Entering parliament at this election were future Prime Ministers Kevin Rudd and Julia Gillard, future Liberal deputy leader and future Minister of Foreign Affairs Julie Bishop, and future Speaker Anna Burke.

Background
The election returned the Member of the House of Representatives for its 1998–2001 term and half of Australia's senators, who then served in the 1999–2002 Senate.

Despite winning almost 51 percent of the two-party-preferred vote and regaining much of what it had lost in its severe defeat of two years earlier, Labor fell short of forming government. The government was re-elected with 49.02% of the two-party-preferred vote, compared to 50.98% for the Australian Labor Party, the largest difference of six election results where the winner did not gain a two-party preferred majority, since 2PP results first estimated from 1937.

The election on 3 October 1998 was held six months earlier than required by the Constitution. Prime Minister John Howard made the announcement following the launch of the coalition's Goods and Services Tax (GST) policy launch and a five-week advertising campaign. The ensuing election was almost entirely dominated by the proposed 10% GST and proposed income tax cuts.

In reaction to One Nation's policies, the other significant parties all agreed to preference against One Nation. One Nation lost its lone house seat when founder and leader Pauline Hanson lost on preferences to Liberal candidate Cameron Thompson in the Queensland electorate of Blair. In Queensland, One Nation polled 14.83% of the Senate vote, sufficient to elect one senator without the need for preferences.
The seat initially went to Heather Hill, but she was subsequently disqualified under Section 44 of the Constitution, and replaced by Len Harris.

The election-eve Newspoll reported Labor on a 53 percent two-party-preferred vote.

On election night of 3 October, the exit poll showed Labor on a 53 percent two-party-preferred vote. Labor made the single biggest gain by an Opposition party following an election defeat; the Coalition's majority was cut from 40 to 12. It was only when the first returns trickled in from Western Australia that the Coalition was assured of another term.  The swing across all states would have normally been sufficient for a change of government, but the uneven nature of the swing left Kim Beazley eight seats short of becoming Prime Minister.
The uneven nature of the swing saw Labor getting huge swings in seats that they held prior to the election but not enough in seats needed to gain government.

Division of Newcastle supplementary election
The election for the division of Newcastle was deferred as the  candidate died on 1 October, two days before the federal election. A supplementary election was held on 21 November, with Labor winning and holding the seat.

Results

House of Representatives results

Senate results

House of Representatives preference flows
 The Nationals had candidates in 13 seats where three-cornered-contests existed, with 88.89% of preferences favouring the Liberal Party.
 One Nation contested 135 electorates with preferences slightly favouring the Liberal/National Coalition (53.66%)
 The Democrats contested 144 electorates with preferences slightly favouring Labor (56.72%)
 The Greens contested 120 electorates with preferences strongly favouring Labor (73.28%)

Seats changing hands

See also
 Candidates of the 1998 Australian federal election
 Members of the Australian House of Representatives, 1998–2001
 Members of the Australian Senate, 1999–2002

Notes

References

Election 98, campaign and results coverage by the ABC
Australian Electoral Commission Results
University of WA  election results in Australia since 1890
AEC 2PP vote
AustralianPolitics.com election details
Preference flows – ABC

Federal elections in Australia
1998 elections in Australia
October 1998 events in Australia